The defending champion was Gabriela Sabatini, but lost in the fourth round to Conchita Martínez. Monica Seles won the title, defeating Judith Wiesner in the final, 6–1, 6–2.

Seeds 
All seeds received a bye to the second round.

Draw

Finals

Top half

Section 1

Section 2

Section 3

Section 4

Bottom half

Section 5

Section 6

Section 7

Section 8

Rerences

External links 
 ITF tournament edition details

Miami Open (tennis)
 
Miami Open (tennis)